Scottsdale Museum of Contemporary Art (SMoCA) in the state of Arizona is a museum in the Old Town district of downtown Scottsdale, Arizona.  The museum is dedicated to exhibiting modern works of art, design and architecture. The Museum has four galleries that house various exhibitions, curated from their growing permanent collection and rotating shows. Knight Rise skyspace, by Arizona artist James Turrell, is permanently on view.

History
SMoCA was conceived in 1988 and opened in February 1999. The now-evocative, minimalist building is a complete retrofit by Phoenix-based architect Will Bruder of a former movie theater.

The museum is run for the city by Scottsdale Arts, a non-profit corporation.

SMoCA has featured major exhibitions from artists such as Lydia Okumura, James Marshall, Paolo Soleri, Squidsoup, Mel Roman, and Olafur Eliasson.

References

External links

Museums in Scottsdale, Arizona
Institutions accredited by the American Alliance of Museums
Art museums established in 1999
Art museums and galleries in Arizona
Contemporary art galleries in the United States
1999 establishments in Arizona